Irkutsky District is an administrative district, one of the thirty-three in Irkutsk Oblast, Russia. Municipally, it is incorporated as Irkutsky Municipal District. It is located in the south of the oblast. Its administrative center is the city of Irkutsk (which is not administratively a part of the district). As of the 2010 Census, the total population of the district was 84,322.

History
The district was established in 1937.

Administrative and municipal status
Within the framework of administrative divisions, Irkutsky District is one of the thirty-three in the oblast. The city of Irkutsk serves as its administrative center, despite being incorporated separately as an administrative unit with the status equal to that of the districts.

As a municipal division, the district is incorporated as Irkutsky Municipal District. The City of Irkutsk is incorporated separately from the district as Irkutsk Urban Okrug.

References

Notes

Sources

Registry of the Administrative-Territorial Formations of Irkutsk Oblast 

Districts of Irkutsk Oblast
States and territories established in 1937